Foreign Papers is an album by English singer/songwriter Gerard McMann (aka Gerard McMahon), released on the Atco Records label in 1986. The album was produced by Gerard McMann, Frank Filipetti and Joe Filipetti.

Track listing
"Everytime I See You "
"Stuff It " 
"True to You" 
"Ain't Too Many More Like You" 
"Message (I'm With You)" 
"All the Way" 
"Lovers of a Tender Fire" 
"Dance Like a Warrior" 
"Check Out"

Personnel
Gerard McMann — producer, synthesizer, vocals, guitar, 
Scott Martin — synthesizer, programming
John Massaro — vocals (background)
Andy Newmark — drums
James Pankow — horn
Walter Parazaider — horn
Caz Silver — vocals (background)
Stuart Ziff — rhythm guitar
Philip Bailey — vocals (background)
Jimmy Bralower — drums
Michael Camacho — vocals (background)
Mare Cohn — vocals (background)
Mark Egan — guitar (bass)
Julie Eigenberg — vocals (background)
Steve Ferrone — drums
Frank Filipetti — producer
Joe Filipetti — producer
Bob Gianetti — vocals (background)
Lani Groves — vocals (background)
Peter Hewlitt — vocals (background)
Danny Keogh — bass
Robert Lamm — vocals (background)
Michael Landau — guitar
Tony Levin — bass
Lee Loughnane — horn
David Lubolt — synthesizer
Jimmy Maelen — percussion 	
Gary Mallaber — vocals (background)
Bruce Martin — vocals (background)

External links
www.artistdirect.com
[ www.allmusic.com]
 

1986 albums
Albums produced by Frank Filipetti
Gerard McMahon albums
Atco Records albums